The men's long jump event at the 1999 All-Africa Games was held 14–15 September at the Johannesburg Stadium.

Medalists

Results

Qualification

Final

References

Athletics at the 1999 All-Africa Games